The 1969 Northern Illinois Huskies football team represented Northern Illinois University as an independent during the 1969 NCAA University Division football season. Led by first-year head coach Doc Urich, the Huskies compiled a record of 3–7. The team played home games at Huskie Stadium in DeKalb, Illinois.

This was Northern Illinois' first year at the highest level in college football, having made the transition from NCAA College Division to NCAA University Division after the previous season.  The Huskies remained an independent for five more seasons until joining the Mid-American Conference (MAC) in 1975.

Schedule

References

Northern Illinois
Northern Illinois Huskies football seasons
Northern Illinois Huskies football